Adrian Gordon Lee (August 3, 1929 – June 6, 2004) was an American politician. He served as a Independent member of the Mississippi House of Representatives.

Life and career 
Lee was born in Pinola, Mississippi. He attended Lake Providence High School, Northeast College and Louisiana Tech University.

In 1964, Lee was elected to the Mississippi House of Representatives, serving until 1968.

Lee died in June 2004 in Ocean Springs, Mississippi, at the age of 74.

References 

1929 births
2004 deaths
Mississippi Independents
Members of the Mississippi House of Representatives
20th-century American politicians
Louisiana Tech University alumni
People from Simpson County, Mississippi